Coabey is a barrio in the municipality of Jayuya, Puerto Rico. Its population in 2010 was 2,166. Coabey is a newer barrio which was formed from areas of Jayuya barrio-pueblo and its first census was done in 1930.

Features
The El Cemí Museum is in Coabey, Jayuya. The museum features Taíno history.

The Casa Canales Museum is in Coabey. The museum features the events and people surrounding the Jayuya Uprising event in 1950.

Gallery

See also

 List of communities in Puerto Rico

References

External links

Barrios of Jayuya, Puerto Rico